Albert Peacock Alloo (26 October 1893 – 21 July 1955) was a New Zealand cricketer and lawyer. He was a left-handed batsman and left-arm slow bowler who played in a single first-class match for Otago in the 1914–15 season. He was born at Sydney in Australia in 1893 and died at Dunedin in 1955.

Alloo made a single first-class appearance, during the 1914–15 season, against Wellington. Batting in the lower order in the first innings, he scored 4 runs, but, when Wellington forced the follow-on, Alloo moved further up the order, where he scored a duck. Alloo bowled 20 overs in the match, conceding 91 runs.

His brothers Cecil and Arthur were also first-class cricketers. The brothers were the grandsons of John Alloo, a Chinese-born businessman on the Ballarat goldfields, and his wife, née Margaret Peacock, who had come out from Scotland. John and Margaret moved to the Otago goldfields in 1868, where he was employed by the Otago Police Force as a constable-interpreter.

Albert Alloo served overseas with the New Zealand Expeditionary Force in the First World War. He was admitted to the Bar in 1927 and practised law in Dunedin.

He died in July 1955 aged 61, leaving a widow and two sons.

References

External links
 

1893 births
1955 deaths
Australian cricketers
Otago cricketers
New Zealand military personnel of World War I
Sportsmen from New South Wales
Australian emigrants to New Zealand
Cricketers from Sydney
New Zealand people of Chinese descent
20th-century New Zealand lawyers